Luis Fenero (born 23 July 1992) is a Spanish retired ice dancer. With partner Celia Robledo, he has competed in the final segment at two ISU Championships — 2013 Junior Worlds in Milan, Italy; and 2016 Europeans in Bratislava, Slovakia.

Fenero competed with Maria Antolin from 2008–10 and with Emili Arm from 2010–11. He teamed up with Robledo in 2011. They moved from Madrid, Spain, to Lyon, France, to train under Muriel Boucher-Zazoui and Romain Haguenauer. In July 2014, they relocated with Haguenauer to Montreal, Quebec, Canada.

Programs

With Robledo

With Antolin

Competitive highlights

With Robledo

With Arm

With Antolin

Single skating

Personal life
Fenero is openly gay. Fenero has been in a relationship with Canadian figure skater Eric Radford since 2016. The pair wed on July 12, 2019.

References

External links 

 
 Celia Robledo / Luis Fenero at sport-folio.net 
 
 Emili Arm / Luis Fenero at sport-folio.net
 
 Maria Antolin / Luis Fenero at sport-folio.net
 Luis Fenero at sport-folio.net

1992 births
Spanish male ice dancers
Living people
People from Jaca
Sportspeople from the Province of Huesca
Gay sportsmen
LGBT figure skaters
Spanish LGBT sportspeople
21st-century Spanish dancers
LGBT dancers
Competitors at the 2015 Winter Universiade
Competitors at the 2013 Winter Universiade